The Sauber Academy – formerly known as the Sauber Junior Team – is an initiative by Sauber Motorsport to help nurture talent from karts through the feeder series ladder to promote them to their Formula One team.

In November 2018, Sauber entered a partnership with Czech team Charouz Racing System to form the Sauber Junior Team, followed by the creation of a karting team in March 2019. After 2019 Sauber parted ways with Charouz and rebranded the programme as the Sauber Academy. Sauber's Karting Team, aligned with Kart Republic, also entails various drivers.

Current drivers

Former drivers

Notes

References

External links
Official website

Racing schools
Sauber Motorsport